Man Crazy is a 1927 American comedy film directed by John Francis Dillon and written by Dwinelle Benthall, Rufus McCosh and Perry Nathan. The film stars Dorothy Mackaill, Jack Mulhall, Edythe Chapman, Phillips Smalley, Walter McGrail and Ray Hallor. The film was released on November 27, 1927, by First National Pictures.

Cast      
Dorothy Mackaill as Clarissa Janeway
Jack Mulhall as Jeffery Pell
Edythe Chapman as Grandmother Janeway
Phillips Smalley as James Janeway
Walter McGrail as Van Breamer
Ray Hallor as Danny

References

External links
 

1927 films
1920s English-language films
Silent American comedy films
1927 comedy films
First National Pictures films
Films directed by John Francis Dillon
American silent feature films
American black-and-white films
1920s American films